The brown-bellied swallow (Orochelidon murina) is a species of bird in the family Hirundinidae.

It is found in Bolivia, Colombia, Ecuador, Peru, and Venezuela. Its natural habitats are subtropical or tropical high-elevation shrubland, subtropical or tropical high-elevation grassland, and pastureland.

Gallery

References

Further reading

brown-bellied swallow
Birds of the Northern Andes
brown-bellied swallow
Taxonomy articles created by Polbot